Stefan Mozar is an electrical engineer who lives in  Australia. He was named a Fellow of the Institute of Electrical and Electronics Engineers (IEEE) in 2015 for his development of safety solutions for electronic equipment. He studied engineering at the University of New South Wales (UNSW), Sydney, Australia, and did his doctoral work at UNSW and Okayama University, Japan.
His work has resulted in patents, inventions, and publications. He has received many awards, including the IEEE Millennium Medal and the David Robinson Award from Engineers Australia.

References

20th-century births
Living people
Australian electrical engineers
Fellow Members of the IEEE
Year of birth missing (living people)
Place of birth missing (living people)